This is a list of characters of the 2010-2011 Japanese tokusatsu series .

Main characters

Eiji Hino
 is a politician's son who grew up in a lavish environment until his life was changed when he attempted to use his fortune to save a small African village, only to accidentally fund a civil war that killed a young girl he befriended. As a result, he renounced his lifestyle and became a wandering vagabond willing to help those in need. Returning to Japan to fund his travels, Eiji takes a part-time job at the Kougami Art Museum, but encounters the Greeed Ankh, who gives him the means to transform into Kamen Rider OOO and convinces him to fight Ankh's fellow Greeed in exchange for Cell Medals. Eiji agrees on the condition that he be allowed to use his Rider powers to help others and later allies himself with the Kougami Foundation amidst his battles with the Greeed.

After falling victim to Kiyoto Maki and the purple Core Medals due to his lack of selfish desires, Eiji slowly becomes a Greeed himself until the Kougami Foundation's head, Kousei Kougami, tells him that the only way to counteract the purple Core Medals is to acquire a desire of his own. Recalling his desire to gain the power to help others, Eiji eventually purges the purple Core Medals from his body, but loses his Rider powers and Ankh after the latter gives his life to help Eiji defeat Maki. Following the battle, Eiji realizes the power he sought comes from those he has bonds with and resumes his travels in the hopes of finding a way to resurrect Ankh.

During the events of the crossover film Kamen Rider × Kamen Rider Fourze & OOO: Movie War Mega Max, Eiji works with the Kougami Foundation as part of his efforts to resurrect Ankh. Eiji later receives help from a revived, future version of Ankh and regains his Rider powers while fighting Kamen Rider Poseidon. In the crossover film Kamen Rider Heisei Generations Final: Build & Ex-Aid with Legend Rider, Eiji creates a temporary simulacrum of Ankh via a replica body created by Kaisei Mogami. During the events of the 10th anniversary V-Cinema Kamen Rider OOO 10th: Core Medal of Resurrection, Eiji sacrifices himself to save a little girl from the First OOO, resurrecting Ankh in the process.

Eiji utilizes three  in conjunction with the  belt and the  device to transform into Kamen Rider OOO. Regardless of which form he is using, he also utilizes the Kougami Foundation's  sword, which allows him to perform the  finisher, and the  motorcycle to combat the Greeed. The Core Medals themselves are coin-like items created by the First OOO's alchemists 800 years prior that draw from different animal characteristics and form the Greeed's core. Using the Core Medals, Eiji can assume varying  forms via a specific color-coded set or mix and match using Core Medals of differing colors. In both cases, he can utilize and combine different animal powers in combat and perform  finishers.

While Eiji initially uses this weapon in his Putotyra Combo form, he later gains the ability to use the Medagabryu in his other Combo forms as he slowly becomes a Greeed.

Using these three Core Medals together allows Eiji to perform the  Scanning Charge.
 : A variant form that Eiji assumes while under the purple Core Medals' influence.
 : An enhanced variant form that Eiji assumes after absorbing all of the Kougami Foundation's Cell Medals and using the First OOO's versions of the Taka, Tora, and Batta Medals.
This form first appears in the crossover film Kamen Rider × Kamen Rider Fourze & OOO: Movie War Mega Max.
Using all three green Core Medals together allows Eiji to produce clones of himself and perform the  Scanning Charge. The Kamakiri Medal first appears in the film Kamen Rider W Forever A to Z The Gaia Memories of Fate.
On their own, the Lion Medal grants the ability to generate bright flashes and the Cheetah Medal grants superhuman speed. Using all three yellow Core Medals together allows Eiji to generate an aura of heat and perform the  Scanning Charge.
On their own, the Sai Medal grants increased headbutting capabilities, the Gorilla Medal equips Eiji with the  gauntlets, and the Zou Medal grants the ability to produce tremors by stomping. Using all three gray Core Medals together grants Eiji superhuman strength, gyrokinesis, and allows him to perform the  Scanning Charge.
On their own, the Kujaku Medal equips Eiji with the shield-like  gauntlet, which allows him to perform  finishers, and the Condor Medal equips Eiji with the talon-like  sabatons. Using all three red Core Medals together grants Eiji the ability to fly and allows him to perform the  Scanning Charge. This form first appears in the non-canonical crossover film Kamen Rider × Kamen Rider OOO & W Featuring Skull: Movie War Core.
This form equips Eiji with the shield-like  gauntlet, which allows him to perform  finishers, and grants him the ability to perform the  Scanning Charge. This form appears exclusively in the V-Cinema anniversary film Kamen Rider OOO 10th: Core Medal of Resurrection.
Using all three blue Core Medals together grants Eiji increased underwater combat capabilities, liquefaction capabilities, and allows him to perform the  Scanning Charge.
Using these three Core Medals together allows Eiji to perform the  Scanning Charge. This form appears exclusively in the anniversary film OOO, Den-O, All Riders: Let's Go Kamen Riders.
This form grants Eiji the ability to fly, cryokinesis, a berserker rage, the ability to destroy non-purple Core Medals, and allows him to perform the  Scanning Charge. Due to the nature of the purple Core Medals, Eiji is unable to mix and match them with the other Core Medals.
On their own, the Cobra Medal grants a two-fold increase in eyesight and infrared perception, the Kame Medal equips Eiji with the carapace-like  gauntlets which can combine to form the  energy shield, and the Wani Medal equips Eiji with the  sabatons. Using all three orange Core Medals together allows Eiji to utilize  to heal himself, wield the  pungi to summon a giant cobra from his head, and perform the  Scanning Charge. This form first appears in the film Kamen Rider OOO Wonderful: The Shogun and the 21 Core Medals.
Using these three Core Medals together allows Eiji to perform the  Scanning Charge. This form appears exclusively in the mobile game Kamen Rider: City Wars and the arcade game Kamen Rider Buttobasoul.
Using these three Core Medals together allows Eiji to perform the  Scanning Charge. This form appears exclusively in the arcade games Kamen Rider Battle: Ganbarizing and Kamen Rider Buttobasoul.
Using these three Core Medals together allows Eiji to perform the  Scanning Charge. This form first appears in the video game Kamen Rider: Memory of Heroez and the arcade game Kamen Rider Buttobasoul.
Using these three Core Medals together allows Eiji to perform the  Scanning Charge. This form appears exclusively in the arcade game Kamen Rider Buttobasoul.
Using these three Core Medals together allows Eiji to perform the  Scanning Charge. This form appears exclusively in the arcade game Kamen Rider Buttobasoul.

Ankh
 is a dishonest bird-themed Greeed who believes he has the right to take whatever he wants, sees people for their flaws, and is at odds with the other Greeed due to being a wild card. As revealed in the Kamen Rider OOO tie-in novel, after the First OOO removed his tenth Core Medal to finalize his creation 800 years before the events of the series, Ankh met a blind girl and created a Yummy to restore her sight out of empathy due to his own dulled senses. However, Ankh regretted his decision after the girl died of fright upon learning that her sight came from people that the Yummy murdered for their eyes. Honoring the girl's last request to protect people, Ankh sided with the First OOO to battle the other Greed until the First OOO betrayed him to steal his Core Medals. After the First OOO was overwhelmed by the Medals' power and sealed the other Greeed, Ankh's right forearm and the Core Medal containing his consciousness were severed from his body, which was sealed separately. As a result, Ankh lost most of his power.

When the Greeed are unsealed in the present, Ankh finds he cannot reform his missing body and steals the other Greeed's Core Medals to handicap them, only to accidentally lose his remaining Taka Medals to Eiji. Ankh intends to regain his other lost Medals and power by enlisting Eiji as the new Kamen Rider OOO, but the latter proves difficult to manipulate, so Ankh reluctantly cooperates with him to save lives on the condition that they gather Cell Medals so Ankh can maintain his form. Along the way, Ankh possesses the body of half-dead Detective Shingo Izumi to blend in with humans, which allows him to fully experience human sensations, but causes him to grow envious of humans. However, Ankh slowly finds himself unable to harm Eiji and his friend Hina Izumi without a substantial reason.

As he regains some of his Core Medals, Ankh discovers what happened to the rest of his body after it develops a mind of its own and turns into Ankh (Lost). They subsequently compete to reabsorb each other under the belief that the weaker one will disappear forever. Ankh (Lost) initially proves victorious, but Eiji uses the purple Core Medals' power to kill him in retaliation for Ankh's apparent death, destroying three of the Greeed's red Core Medals in the process. Despite being able to reconstitute himself, Ankh finds he lost some of his power due to the Core Medals he lost and re-possesses Shingo before seemingly joining Maki and the other Greeed in the hopes of secretly manipulating Eiji into destroying the other Greeed so he can use all of their Core Medals to fully fuse himself with Shingo and become a true conscious being. While carrying out the scheme, he unconditionally gives the other Greeed their Core Medals back, a result of his being spoiled by his experiences with human senses and disgusted with his fellow Greeed.

However, Ankh finds himself unable to kill Eiji due to their history together and his newfound capacity for feeling deeper emotions and betrays Maki, who responds by breaking the Core Medal holding Ankh's consciousness. In spite of this, Ankh accepts his death and gives Eiji his remaining three Core Medals to counteract the latter's purple Core Medals long enough for Eiji to defeat Maki. After aiding him in the fight, Ankh's spirit appears before Eiji to express gratitude to him and others for allowing the former to live and die as a human before giving him and Hina his broken Core Medal. 

During the events of the crossover film Kamen Rider × Kamen Rider Fourze & OOO: Movie War Mega Max, a revived future version of Ankh travels back in time to help Eiji defeat Kamen Rider Poseidon. During the events of the V-Cinema Kamen Rider OOO 10th: Core Medal of Resurrection, Eiji sacrifices himself to fully resurrect Ankh.

Hina Izumi
 is Shingo's sister who works at the Cous Coussier restaurant and possesses superhuman strength, which she expresses embarrass towards. Following the Greeed's awakening, Shingo's death, and Ankh possessing Shingo, Eiji initially uses her brother's phone to tell Hina Shingo is on a deep-cover mission before eventually telling her the truth and vowing to save Shingo. Realizing Eiji's reasons for looking after Ankh and Shingo, Hina convinces Eiji to work at Cous Coussier so she can care for her brother's body and use her strength to keep Ankh in line. She also comes to realize that she relies on Eiji's desire to help to an unhealthy degree, takes steps to ensure he does not blindly sacrifice himself for other people's sake, and cares for Ankh as if he were her brother.

Kamen Rider Birth
Operators of the Birth System utilize the  belt to transform, wield the  machine gun, which uses Cell Medals as ammo, and the  units, all of which function as Cell Medal magnets. Summoning all six of the Birth CLAWs units at once allows the operator to either access the heavily armed  form or combine them to form the scorpion-like  mecha for combat assistance.

Additionally, Maki developed a prototypical version called , which can only summon two of the Birth CLAWs units.

Shintaro Goto
 is a former police officer who works for the Kougami Foundation to keep the world safe from the Greeed and eventually becomes Eiji's friend. Despite initially using the prototype Birth system, Goto eventually succeeds his mentor Akira Date as the current operator of the complete Birth System.

In the web series Birth of Birth X: Prologue and OOO 10th Kamen Rider Birth: Secret Story of the Birth of Birth X and the V-Cinema Kamen Rider OOO 10th: Core Medal of Resurrection, Goto acquires the  belt, which he can use in conjunction with the man-made Ebi, Kani, and Sasori Core Medals to transform into .

Akira Date
 is a young combat medic who prefers getting his job done perfectly rather than enjoying what he does. He initially traveled the world before returning to Japan, where he was hired by the Kougami Foundation to become the first user of the Kamen Rider Birth system with Shintaro Goto as his apprentice. Due to a cranial injury preventing him from using the Birth System for extended periods of time, Date eventually leaves Japan to undergo a life-saving surgery and passes the mantle of Birth to Goto. Following its success, he returns months later and uses the prototype Birth System to assist Goto in his fight against the Greeed.

As of the V-Cinemas Kamen Rider Zi-O: Geiz Majesty and Kamen Rider OOO 10th: Core Medal of Resurrection, Date acquires a second complete version of the Birth Driver.

Recurring characters

Greeed
The  are coin-based, animal-themed homunculi created by the First OOO via the power of 50 Core Medals as part of his plan to achieve godhood 800 years prior to the series. Originally mindless, the Greeed attained sentience after one medal from each of their respective sets was destroyed. However, they lack true life and crave endlessly, cursed with a void in them that can never be filled, possess distorted sensory input (e.g., colors are washed out, taste is nonexistent, sounds are muffled and distorted), and are incapable of feeling deeper emotions such as love. As such, the Greeed became bent on consuming everything around them in a vain attempt at experiencing what humans normally take for granted, only to be sealed by the First OOO after he stole their Core Medals and was overwhelmed by their power.

When the seal is undone in the present, Ankh steals some of his fellow Greeed's Core Medals to handicap them due to his being unable to completely reform his body. In response, the remaining Greeed create Yummy to find Ankh, regain their stolen Core Medals, and gather Cell Medals to maintain their physical forms. Upon realizing how much humanity changed in the intervening years, the Greeed mimic human forms to blend in.

During the events of the V-Cinema anniversary film Kamen Rider OOO 10th: Core Medal of Resurrection, the Greeed are revived alongside the First OOO, who absorbs them for their power before Goda does so in turn and Ankh kills Goda.

Each Greeed possesses nine Core Medals, which allow them to maintain their powers and armored forms so long as they do not lose them. If they lose all but one, they become unable to maintain their Greeed forms and suffer terrible pain, though Uva is able to maintain his armored head and right forearm. Moreover, a Greeed's consciousness is contained in one of their corresponding Core Medals. Destruction of this Medal will permanently destroy the Greeed. If their body is destroyed, but the medal containing their consciousness remains, it can act autonomously and possess human bodies.

Uva
 is an insect-themed Greeed and the most hot-headed of his kind who assumes the form of a young man wearing a green leather jacket in order to blend in with society. Having lost the most Core Medals compared to the other Greeed, Uva is the first to try and find Ankh in the hopes of regaining them. After Kazari kills Gamel and Mezool while in pursuit of his newfound desire to evolve, Uva decides to act on his own and find his own form of evolution through the Core Medals. Despite coming into possession of some of Gamel and Mezool's Medals, Uva saves them in favor of seeding people with Kuzu Yummy and using them to produce a massive amount of Cell Medals so he can drastically increase his power and resurrect the fallen Greeed. He succeeds in both tasks, but Gamel and Mezool betray him and join Kazari and Ankh (Lost) in destroying Uva's body. As the Core Medal containing his consciousness survived, Uva possesses a man named Kusada and uses him to recreate his body before supporting Ankh in his fight against Kazari. Along the way, Uva regains all of his Core Medals, but is mortally wounded by Eiji Hino via the First OOO's Core Medals and overloaded by Kiyoto Maki via the other Greeed's Core Medals.

In his complete form, Uva has increased jumping capabilities and can discharge lightning from the claws on his right arm and horns. His insect-themed Yummy pull themselves out of their host's bodies, then either seek out and physically consume the object of their progenitor's desire or carry out an extreme version of the desire before molting into their complete forms in both cases. Additionally, Uva typically remains in contact with the host to some degree and is the only Greeed who chooses to create and command Kuzu Yummy.

Kazari
 is a feline-themed Greeed and an arrogant schemer who assumes the form of a silver-haired young man in a yellow checkered blazer. Having lost the least amount of Core Medals out of all the Greeed, he discovers that a third party is involved in the search for the Medals and breaks off to learn more about them. Along the way, Kazari meets Kiyoto Maki and aligns himself with the scientist to find his missing Core Medals, diverting from the Greeed's original goal of consumption to evolution. This new ideology leads to Kazari using Gamel, Mezool, and Uva as test subjects to experiment with the idea of a Greeed possessing foreign Core Medals. In spite of Gamel and Mezool being killed in the process, Kazari deems the experiment a success and absorbs three of Mezool's and two of Gamel's Core Medals to undergo a controlled evolution. Using his new powers, Kazari temporarily gets all but one of his own Core Medals back and regains his complete form, but loses two of his to Eiji.

Following this, Kazari eventually recruits Ankh (Lost) and convinces Maki to leave the Kougami Foundation. Upon learning Uva is attempting to revive Gamel and Mezool, Kazari assists him by giving up his additional powers before manipulating Gamel and Mezool into joining him. After Ankh and Uva join the group however, Kazari becomes upset by this development, but is forced to bide his time until he regains his Core Medals. Eventually, Kazari manipulates Gamel into taking the other Greeed's Core Medals and damaging Kamen Rider Birth to regain his complete form, but Eiji uses the purple Core Medals' power to damage the Core Medal holding Kazari's consciousness. Kazari survives the attack, but Maki steals his remaining intact Medals and leaves the Greeed to die.

In his complete form, Kazari possesses superhuman speed, aerokinesis, and the ability to use his dreadlocks like tendrils. His feline-themed Yummy are parasitic in nature, possessing the human and forcing them to partake in their desire even at the risk of their lives until they reach their complete form and consume the host. After absorbing Mezool and Gamel's Core Medals, Kazari gains their powers and the ability to create hybrid Yummy.

Gamel
 is a heavy mammal-themed Greeed who possesses the mentality of a dimwitted, spoiled child and an affinity towards Mezool. Upon his awakening, he loses four Core Medals to an unknown party and takes on the form of a young man dressed in a grey mesh shirt over a black undershirt. Due to his low intelligence, he is easily manipulated by Kazari into absorbing Mezool and Uva's Core Medals. While they temporarily restore his complete form, Gamel suffers from energy overload until Mezool absorbs him.

Following her transformation into a Mega Greeed and subsequent destruction, Gamel's Core Medals are divided amongst the surviving Greeed until Uva eventually revives him and Mezool. When Kazari and Ankh (Lost) convince Mezool to join their cause, Gamel joins them out of loyalty to her. After Ankh recovers and gives Gamel the rest of his remaining Core Medals and Mezool is killed by Kamen Rider OOO, a grief-stricken Gamel attacks people using his Cell Medal production powers in a futile attempt to resurrect her. However, Kiyoto Maki damages two of Gamel's Core Medals and Shintaro Goto and Akira Date work together to permanently kill Gamel.

In his complete form, Gamel possesses the most physical strength of the Greeed, gauntlet armored fists, gyrokinesis, can form a trunk from his face, the ability to consume inedible matter, and the ability to turn anything he touches into Cell Medals. Unlike the other Greeed, Gamel uses his own body to create his large animal-themed Yummy upon observing a particular behavior he wants to mimic; satiating his own desires. As a result, the created Yummy are composed of a single Cell Medal.

Mezool
 is a marine animal-themed Greeed and the only female of the group. She comes off as the kindest member of her kind due in part to her methods being able to provide enough Cell Medals for all of them and serves as a mother figure as her desire is to know and feel true love. Following her awakening, she assumes the form of a teenage girl typically dressed in blue clothing.

After losing most of her remaining Core Medals to Kazari and being attacked by Uva, she discovers Gamel absorbed her Core Medals and absorbs him in turn. However, due to the excess number of foreign Core Medals he previously absorbed and not having enough of her own to counteract the overload, the unstable Mezool temporarily regains her complete form until Maki adds two of Uva's Core Medals and several thousand Cell Medals to turn her into the mindless leviathan-like . She is eventually destroyed by Kamen Riders OOO and Birth, with the Core Medals that contributed to her transformation being divided amongst Ankh, Uva, and Kazari.

After Uva manages to revive her and Gamel, Mezool sides with Kazari, Ankh (Lost), and Gamel to regain her Core Medals until Ankh returns them to her. Spurred on by Kiyoto Maki, she breaks off to achieve her desire by abducting several mother/child pairs and sealing them in her Yummy eggs to drain the love and life from them. However, Eiji Hino uses the purple Core Medals' power to shatter three of her Core Medals, permanently killing her and causing her to die in Gamel's arms.

In her complete form, Mezool has the ability to generate torrents of water from her hands, possesses incredible agility, and can liquefy her body. Her marine animal-themed Yummy, which first become roe-like eggs, feed indirectly off their host's desire while forming a "nest" that incubates over a period of time while the host indulges their desire. Their presence are mostly concealed until the Yummy eggs hatch into their complete forms and are compelled to return to Mezool and break up into many Cell Medals for her and the Greeed to ingest.

Ankh (Lost)
 is a Greeed that came into being when Ankh transferred the Core Medal containing his consciousness into his right arm before it was disconnected from the rest of his body when he and the other Greeed were sealed. Without Ankh's consciousness, the body entered a state of suspended animation and eventually became a separate being with a child-like mind and the desire to become whole. After Kougami extracts one of his remaining Core Medals, Ankh (Lost) awakens, travels across Japan in search of Ankh, and makes himself known after creating Yummy that act on his desires. Ankh (Lost) later allies himself with Kazari and Maki, replicating the form of young boy to blend in with society while his personality gradually develops into one similar to Ankh's. Combined with tutoring from Kazari and the other Greeed, Ankh (Lost) executes a complex and nearly successful plan to absorb Ankh while his guard is down. Nevertheless, Ankh (Lost) finds that Ankh continues to resist as the latter had secretly given Hina Izumi one of his Core Medals at the last second. In his attempt to complete his victory, Ankh (Lost) is eventually destroyed by Eiji Hino, who uses the purple Core Medals' power to shatter the three Core Medals that cemented his existence.

Compared to the original, Ankh (Lost) retains almost all of Ankh's powers and his bird-themed Yummy share the same attributes as Ankh's. Additionally, his Greeed form resembles that of Ankh's, albeit with an incomplete right side.

Yummy
The  are coin-based monsters that feed on human desire and serve as subordinates to the Greeed, who create them by using Cell Medals on primarily human hosts. While they have different methods for doing so, all Yummy seek to use their host to evolve from their shared mummy-like  forms into their individual complete forms and empower themselves. Being the product of the Greeed that created them, the Yummy will take on characteristics of their creator's Core Medals. As such, if a Greeed possesses multiple types of Core Medals or multiple Greeed use the same host, they can create chimeric hybrid Yummy. If a host's primary desire changes, the Yummy will split off into multiple similar Yummy, with the original pursuing the original desire while the additional Yummy pursue the new desires.

Additionally, Uva produces Shiro Yummy-like  by breaking Cell Medals in half. While they are weaker than regular Yummy, Kuzu Yummy are easier to create en masse, harder to destroy with physical attacks, and do not require hosts.

 : A mantis-themed Yummy capable of creating scythe-like energy projectiles that Uva created from an unnamed woman's desire to buy a particular necklace from a jewelry store. The Kamakiri Yummy is destroyed by Kamen Rider OOO.
 : A giant non-anthropomorphic leaf-rolling weevil-themed Yummy with two arm-like mouths that Uva created from an unnamed robber's desire for money. The Otoshibumi Yummy is destroyed by Kamen Rider OOO.
 : A cat-themed Yummy with an obese body capable of withstanding slicing attacks that Kazari created from the gluttonous . The Neko Yummy is separated from Fukuji and destroyed by Kamen Rider OOO.
 : A school of non-anthropomorphic namesake-themed Yummy. Mezool created one group from shopaholic  before they are destroyed by Kamen Rider OOO. Mezool later creates another group from an unnamed con artist while OOO is distracted by the Siamneko Yummy, which succeed in their goal of feeding the Greeed Cell Medals.
 : A namesake-themed Yummy with immense strength and the ability to create shockwaves capable of throwing objects that Gamel created after seeing a married couple fight. The Bison Yummy is destroyed by Kamen Rider OOO.
 : A school of shark-themed Yummy capable of liquefying solid material in order to swim through it, moving at superhuman speed, and firing pressurized water balls from their mouths that Mezool created from Kougami Biotech Laboratory worker and mad bomber . Initially hatching one by one before doing so en masse, the first Same Yummy succeeds in its purpose of feeding the Greeed Cell Medals while Kamen Rider OOO destroys the remaining Same Yummies.
 : A swallowtail butterfly-themed Yummy with flight capabilities and explosive pollen that Uva created from blogger  desire to become famous. The Ageha Yummy is destroyed by Kamen Rider OOO.
 : A Siamese cat-themed Yummy with scalpel-like claws that Kazari created from surgeon , who feels her father, the director of the hospital she works at, is holding her back due to her pride and lack of fear for her patients' well being. The Siamneko Yummy is separated from Tamura and destroyed by Kamen Rider OOO.
 : A tortoise-themed Yummy who can retract into his shell and spin at high-speeds that Kazari tricked Gamel into creating to gain Mezool's approval. The Rikugame Yummy is destroyed by Kamen Rider OOO.
 : A rhinoceros beetle-themed Yummy with dense armor-like skin that Uva created from  initial desire to become stronger. The Kabuto Yummy is destroyed by Kamen Riders OOO and Birth.
 : A stag beetle-themed Yummy with dense armor-like skin and electrokinesis that split off from the Kabuto Yummy in response to Shiratori's new desire to eliminate her kendo teacher's bride. The Kuwagata Yummy is destroyed by Kamen Rider Birth.
 : A lion/jellyfish-themed hybrid Yummy with photo- and thermokinesis and the ability to produce small, non-anthropomorphic, self-replicating jellyfish-like  that Kazari created from fugitive  desire to get revenge on Shingo Izumi for arresting him and his ex-partner for betraying him. The Lion-Kurage Yummy is destroyed by Kamen Rider OOO.
 : A grasshopper-themed Yummy with a warped hero mentality, superhuman speed, electrokinesis, and enhanced jumping and kicking capabilities that Uva created from  desire for justice after he attended law school, but failed his bar exam. The Batta Yummy is destroyed by Kamen Rider OOO.
 : A stingray/rhinoceros-themed hybrid Yummy with enhanced swimming capabilities, dense skin, and the ability to lay eggs that hatch into non-anthropomorphic stingray-like  that Kazari created from cosmetics company researcher  desire to become more beautiful than her younger sister Rei. After Kamen Rider Birth removes the Cell Medals making up its rhinoceros half, the Ei-Sai Yummy transforms into the giant non-anthropomorphic devil ray-esque  before it is destroyed by Kamen Rider OOO.
 : A series of parrot-themed Yummy that can fly, possess pyrokinesis, and petrification capabilities. Ankh (Lost) creates a blue-colored version from punch drunk boxer  desire to continue fighting despite his condition before it is destroyed by Kamen Riders OOO and Birth. Ankh (Lost) later creates a red Oumu Yummy from an unknown host before it is also destroyed by Kamen Rider OOO.
 : A squid/jaguar-themed hybrid Yummy with superhuman strength and agility and a spear for a right hand that Kazari created from former Shocker Combatman turned Kougami Foundation employee  desire to defeat the Kamen Riders. The Ika-Jaguar Yummy is destroyed by Kamen Rider OOO and the CLAWS Sasori.
 : An orca/giant panda-themed hybrid Yummy that possesses superhuman strength, claws on its right hand, and an orca-like left arm that Kazari created from Kiyoto Maki's desire to see his deceased sister Hitomi. The Shachi-Panda Yummy is destroyed by Kamen Riders OOO and Birth.
 : A yellow-crested spangle-themed Yummy with aerokinesis and similar abilities as the Ageha Yummy that Uva created from  desire to earn money to pay back his late teacher's family. The Kuroageha Yummy is destroyed by Kamen Rider OOO.
 Male : A series of male namesake-themed Yummy that can fly and produce fireballs, ultrasonic waves, and acidic smoke. In the non-canonical film Kamen Rider × Kamen Rider OOO & W Featuring Skull: Movie War Core Giru creates a male Pteranodon Yummy from an unknown object before it is destroyed by Kamen Riders Accel and Birth. In the series, Maki creates two male Pteranodon Yummy from the candle he used to murder Hitomi with before they are both destroyed by Kamen Rider OOO.
 Female Pteranodon Yummy: A female variant of the Pteranodon Yummy with similar abilities. In Movie War Core, Giru creates a female Pteranodon Yummy from Yoshino Akechi's shoe after she breaks her leg and believes her dream of becoming a professional dancer is dashed before the Yummy is destroyed by Kamen Rider OOO. In the series, Maki creates a female Pteranodon Yummy from the candle he used to murder Hitomi with before it is destroyed by Kamen Rider OOO.
 : A snowy owl-themed Yummy that can fly and possesses aerokinesis and bladed feathers that Ankh (Lost) created from Eiji's high school friend  desire to ensure no one else can be Eiji's friend except him. The Fukurou Yummy is destroyed by Kamen Rider OOO.
 : A namesake-themed Yummy with the ability to remove and destroy most victims' dreams that Maki created from  second-place trophy, which represented her broken dream of becoming a fashion designer. After failing to destroy Eiji Hino's dream, which was too large for it to destroy, the Unicorn Yummy is destroyed by Kamen Rider OOO.
 : A sea urchin/armadillo-themed hybrid Yummy armed with insomnia-inducing needles and dense armor-like skin that Mezool created from a sleepy Gamel. The Uni-Armadillo Yummy is destroyed by Kamen Rider OOO.
 : A gamecock-themed Yummy that is adept in Muay Thai and possesses tendril-like ribbons that Ankh (Lost) created from deranged perfectionist  desire to attack anyone she considers a bad neighbor. The Shamo Yummy is destroyed by Kamen Rider OOO.
 : A namesake-themed Yummy with a spike-covered body, cryokinesis, and a mace for a right hand that Maki created from an ice cube that Ankh (Lost) shattered in frustration over being incomplete. The Ankylosaurus Yummy is destroyed by Kamen Rider Birth.
 : A vulture-themed Yummy with aerokinesis that Ankh created from  desire to be the only male in the world. The Hagetaka Yummy is destroyed by Kamen Riders OOO and Birth.

Other Yummy
 : An atypical namesake/baboon/leopard/anaconda-themed Yummy with fire breath and enhanced jumping capabilities that Gara created to serve him. The Nue Yummy is destroyed by Kamen Rider OOO.
 : A namesake-themed Yummy that Ankh created from an unnamed blind girl's desire to see. The Yummy obliged by attacking people and gouging out their eyes to give to the girl. However, she went insane from witnessing the carnage the Condor Yummy wrought and renounced her desire, causing the Yummy to disperse into Cell Medals. The Condor Yummy appears exclusively in the Kamen Rider OOO tie-in novel of the same name.
 : A namesake-themed Yummy that Uva created from the First OOO's desire's to become stronger. It quickly achieved its complete form due to the First OOO's unlimited desire, but was destroyed by him and Ankh. The Cockroach Yummy appears exclusively in the Kamen Rider OOO tie-in novel of the same name.
 : A namesake-themed Yummy that Kazari created from the First OOO's desire to become stronger. It quickly achieved its complete form due to the First OOO's unlimited desire, but was destroyed by him and Ankh. The Lion Yummy appears exclusively in the Kamen Rider OOO tie-in novel of the same name.
 : A namesake-themed Yummy that Mezool created from the First OOO's desire to become stronger. It quickly achieved its complete form due to the First OOO's unlimited desire, but was destroyed by him and Ankh. The Whale Yummy appears exclusively in the Kamen Rider OOO tie-in novel of the same name.

Kougami Foundation
The  is a public organization that has been researching the Greeed and the civilization that created them ever since the company acquired the sarcophagus holding them and their Core Medals, which they placed in the  basement. As a result, they renamed the basement the King's Room and developed many Cell Medal-based devices and weaponry. When the Greeed re-awaken and a new Kamen Rider OOO is found, the Kougami Foundation provide assistance to the latter.

Kousei Kougami
 is the eccentric president of the Kougami Foundation and a descendant of the First OOO. Well versed in the history of OOO and the Core Medals, he has anticipated the Greeed's awakening and amassed several Cell Medals and artifacts related to them and OOO. Displaying an obsession for the birth of all things, good or bad, Kougami loves baking cakes, commonly birthday cakes, built his office over a bakery, always has a record player in his office that usually plays "Happy Birthday", and provides items to OOO through presents. Additionally, Kougami is easily excited and becomes incredibly enthusiastic over events related to the OOO/Greeed conflict and the birth of new developments, shouting  at things that please him and "happy birthday!" whenever something new happens. In addition, he believes desires are the purest and most powerful energy source in existence and that it plays a major role in the evolution of life on Earth. This belief is so strong, he encourages everyone around him to succumb to their own desires and do whatever they want as long as it does not interfere with his own desires, sees OOO as the means to ensure an unlimited supply of energy, and wishes to have the purple Core Medals destroyed as soon as possible as they represent the opposite of desire.

During the events of the crossover film Kamen Rider × Kamen Rider Fourze & OOO: Movie War Mega Max, it is revealed that Kougami began researching methods for creating new Core Medals that run on desire alone and developed the Poseidon Driver, which he gave to Michal Minato forty years after the series.

Erika Satonaka
 is Kousei Kougami's personal secretary and cake tester who sees things from a business-related point of view. Despite her job, she prefers spicy foods and is capable of holding her own in battle against Yummies. After Goto becomes the new Kamen Rider Birth, Satonaka becomes his partner despite being his superior, carrying her own Birth Buster and a suitcase containing additional supplies such as Cell Medals. However, she is often late to battles due to obsessing over her appearance, much to Goto's chagrin.

Shingo Izumi
 is Hina Izumi's older brother and a police detective. Following the Greeed's awakening, he is mortally wounded by the Kamakiri Yummy then subsequently possessed by Ankh, who slowly reanimates Shingo over the course of the series until Ankh and Ankh (Lost) compete to absorb each other, with Shingo experiencing everything Ankh did to his body while he was possessed. After Ankh sacrifices himself to help Eiji Hino defeat Kiyoto Maki, a fully revived Shingo resumes his work as a police detective.

Shingo Izumi is portrayed by Ryosuke Miura, who also portrays Ankh.

Chiyoko Shiraishi
 is the owner of the  who enjoys cosplaying and frequently changes her restaurant's decor to fit different cultural themes as a means to attract more customers. Despite hiring Hina, Eiji, and Shintaro Goto and allowing Ankh to live at Cous Coussier, Shiraishi remains unaware of their battles with the Greeed until Eiji's transformation into one and Ankh's near destruction convinces Hina to tell Shiraishi the truth.

First OOO
An unnamed king of a mysterious lost European civilization whose  and god complex led to him becoming the  800 years ago. In pursuit of godhood, he commissioned Gara and three other alchemists to create the Greeed and their Core Medals so he could hunt them and use their power to subjugate his enemies. Eventually, the king's avarice drove him to unite the Core Medals' power, only for them to overwhelm him and transform his body into a stone coffin that sealed four of the Greeed and Ankh's right arm for centuries. The king's only known descendant, Kousei Kougami, attempts to finish his work in the present through Eiji Hino.

After killing Eiji, the First OOO absorbs the Greeed, but Ankh weakens him enough for the artificial Greeed, Goda, to use Eiji's body and the purple Core Medals to permanently kill the First OOO.

While the First OOO also utilizes the OOO Driver and O-Scanner to transform into Kamen Rider OOO like his successor, he possessed stronger versions of the Taka, Tora, and Batta Core Medals. Following his resurrection and absorbing the Greeed, he transforms into his , which allows him to use their full powers without transforming into his different Combo forms.

Kiyoto Maki
 is a deadpan, nihilistic scientist who serves as the overseer of the Kougami Foundation's  and devised their Medal System. After suffering emotional abuse from his older sister and legal guardian, and murdering her via arson, Kiyoto came to believe that one's true value is defined by how it ends. However, he repressed the memory and deluded himself into believing Hitomi was a loving sister and that her death was an accident. Also as a result of the incident, Kiyoto struggles with social communication; choosing instead to speak to a doll nicknamed  that he was given sometime prior rather than to speak to someone directly. His bond with the doll is so strong, he keeps it on his shoulder or arm, cherishes as if it were a real person, and will become unable to speak properly and agitated if it is separated from his person.

Despite preferring to study the Greeed, Kiyoto is forced to work on the Kougami Foundation's Core and Cell Medal-related projects to fund his own research. His fixation with the Greeed would lead to him forming an alliance with the Greeed, Kazari, to assist in the latter's experiment with Core Medal-based evolution. However, Kousei Kougami discovers what happened and threatens Kiyoto into ending his partnership with Kazari, who retaliates by using Kiyoto as the host for the Shachi-Panda Yummy. This would lead to Kiyoto ending up in the care of Chiyoko Shiraishi, whom he previously developed an obsession with due to her resemblance to Hitomi. Her kindness unlocks his repressed memory and causes him to reaffirm his belief that the world should end before he steals the purple Core Medals from Kougami, destroys his laboratory, and fully aligns himself with the Greeed in the hopes of using them to end the world.

Over time, he kills Kazari and mortally wounds Gamel and Ankh for their Core Medals before using them and those of Mezool's on Uva to turn him into a Medal Vessel. Leaving Kiyo-chan in Shiraishi's care as he no longer needs the doll, Kiyoto faces Eiji Hino and Ankh in combat. While they defeat him and cause him to collapse into a black hole that engulfed all of the Core Medals, Kiyoto takes delight in his death.

Via the purple Core Medals, Kiyoto can use Cell Medals on inanimate objects that represent the end of a desire, such as broken dreams, to create dinosaur and mythical animal-themed Yummy.

Spin-off exclusive characters

Nobunaga
 is a Cell Medal-based homunculus created by the Kougami Foundation from the mummified remains of his conqueror namesake Oda Nobunaga who appears exclusively in the non-canonical crossover film Kamen Rider × Kamen Rider OOO & W Featuring Skull: Movie War Core. He attacks one such individual, but is driven off by Eiji Hino as Kamen Rider OOO and reverts to his human form. In his confused state, Nobunaga ends up Eiji's care and learns about the modern world from him. Along the way, he encounters Akechi Mitsuhide's descendant, Yoshino Akechi, but falls in love with her. However, Nobunaga's body suffers from Cell Medal breakdown and is forced to absorb the black Sasori, Kani, and Ebi Core Medals, which enhances his Greeed form and turns him into a mindless monster. He attacks Yoshino, but is defeated by Eiji. As he breaks down into Cell Medals, Nobunaga asks Eiji to give Yoshino a flower for him before the black Core Medals fly off and contribute to Kamen Rider Core's creation.

Yoshino Akechi
 is a friend of Hina Izumi and the descendant of Akechi Mitsuhide who appears exclusively in the non-canonical crossover film Kamen Rider × Kamen Rider OOO & W Featuring Skull: Movie War Core. While pursuing her dream of becoming a professional ballet dancer, the Nobunaga homunculus falls in love with her, but she rejects his advances. After breaking her leg, Giru uses her to create a female Pteranodon Yummy, but Nobunaga uses the last of his energy to heal her.

Giru
, credited as "Kyouryu Greeed", is a dinosaur-themed Greeed who appears exclusively in the non-canonical crossover film Kamen Rider × Kamen Rider OOO & W Featuring Skull: Movie War Core. He creates a male and female Pteranodon Yummy to facilitate the creation of Kamen Rider Core and the doomsday it will bring about.

Prior to the series, Giru's ten purple Core Medals were originally in an inactive state as they were sealed in a separate location. They were eventually found and contained by the Kougami Foundation in the present due to their destructive power, but Kiyoto Maki steals them after severing his ties with the company. Five of the Medals sense Eiji's lack of desire and infect him while Kiyoto absorbs the remaining five and eventually transforms into the series' version of the Kyouryu Greeed.

Kamen Rider Core
 is a giant magma-based monster created from the black Sasori, Kani, and Ebi Core Medals and the Memory Gaia Memory who appears exclusively in the non-canonical crossover film Kamen Rider × Kamen Rider OOO & W Featuring Skull: Movie War Core. He attempts to destroy the world, but is foiled and destroyed by Kamen Riders OOO and W, who shatter the Medals and Memory in the process.

In battle, Core is powered by Earth's inner core, can burn anything within physical contact, possesses pyrokinesis, and can turn the lower half of his body into a motorcycle.

Shocker Greeed
The  is a Greeed created by the terrorist organization Shocker who appears exclusively in the anniversary film OOO, Den-O, All Riders: Let's Go Kamen Riders. In the 1970s, the organization obtained a Core Medal and modified it into the Shocker Medal, but were unable to use it in the "primary" timeline. However, Ankh's failed attempt to use Kamen Rider Den-O's DenLiner to travel through time and steal the other Greeed's Core Medals while they were sealed results in Shocker obtaining a Cell Medal that Ankh dropped and combining it with the Shocker Medal to create the Shocker Greeed, who defeats Kamen Riders 1 and 2 in the past and creates an alternate timeline where Shocker conquered the world, with 1 and 2 as their brainwashed enforcers. However, Kamen Rider New Den-O's failed attempt to undo the Shocker Greeed's creation creates a time paradox that leads to 1 and 2 being cured of their brainwashing and eventually destroying the Shocker Greeed in the altered present while the Shocker Medal fades away after the original timeline is restored.

Tokugawa Yoshimune
 is the eighth shogun of the Tokugawa shogunate who appears exclusively in the film Kamen Rider OOO Wonderful: The Shogun and the 21 Core Medals. Due to Gara creating a time distortion that merges part of Yoshimune's version of Edo with the modern day version, Yoshimune works with Kamen Rider OOO to protect the city and later gives him the orange Core Medals, which Yoshimune received from Europe.

Matsudaira also performs the theme song for Kamen Rider OOO Wonderful: The Shogun and the 21 Core Medals alongside Shu Watanabe (as Eiji Hino) and Ryosuke Miura (as Ankh).

Gara
 is an androgynous alchemist who was commissioned by the First OOO to create the Core Medals 800 years ago and appears exclusively in the film Kamen Rider OOO Wonderful: The Shogun and the 21 Core Medals. However, the First OOO killed Gara and his fellow alchemists once they completed the commission, with Gara buried in Thuringia. After Kousei Kougami unearths his tomb, Gara is revived and uses his alchemy to transfer his tower from Thuringia to Japan before capturing Kougami and Erika Satonaka and possessing . Believing that the world has changed little since his death, Gara takes the Core Medals back and gathers human desire to cause three time distortions in order to bring about a doomsday scenario. Despite this, Kougami tricks Gara into using Eiji, whose infinite desire overloads the machine Gara was using to execute his plans. After Eiji rescues Wakaba, Gara assumes his true Greeed-like , only to be defeated by Kamen Riders OOO and Fourze. In response, Gara uses the Core Medals to transmute himself into the Mega Greeed-like , but is destroyed by Kamen Riders OOO and Birth.

As the Gara-possessed Wakaba, Sakai had her voice digitally deepened and altered.

Bells
The  are cell-based, Harlequin-like, triplet familiars created by Gara to serve him who appear exclusively in the film Kamen Rider OOO Wonderful: The Shogun and the 21 Core Medals

Michal Minato
 is a young man from the year 2050 who can transform into  despite ironically suffering from aquaphobia and appears exclusively in the crossover film Kamen Rider × Kamen Rider Fourze & OOO: Movie War Mega Max. While operating as Aqua, he came into contact with the black hole that Kiyoto Maki collapsed into, exposed to the Core Medals Maki absorbed, and possessed by the Greeed-like entity, Kamen Rider Poseidon. Using Minato, Poseidon travels back in time to eliminate all Kamen Riders, only to separate himself from Minato, who goes on to conquer his aquaphobia and defeat Poseidon alongside Kamen Rider OOO, who reclaims the Core Medals that contributed to Poseidon's creation. Following this, Minato gives OOO the  before returning to his time to protect it.

Minato utilizes the  belt in conjunction with the  liquid to transform into Kamen Rider Aqua.

Kamen Rider Poseidon
 is a Greed-like entity formed from the Core Medals that Michal Minato absorbed who appears exclusively in the film Kamen Rider × Kamen Rider Fourze & OOO: Movie War Mega Max. Possessing Minato, Poseidon received the means to transform into a Kamen Rider from an aged Kousei Kougami before traveling back in time to eliminate all Kamen Riders. However, the Ankh of his time followed him to the past and joined forces with Kamen Rider OOO to separate Poseidon from Minato. Poseidon attempts to travel to another time period, only to be destroyed by Kamen Riders OOO and Aqua while his Core Medals end up in Lem Kannagi's possession.

Muchiri
 is a man-made arthropod-themed Greeed with unlimited use of Core Energy that Foundation X scientist Professor Zeus created in an attempt to revive his colleague Aida and appears exclusively in the video game Kamen Rider: Memory of Heroez. While Aida betrays Zeus to take control of Muchiri and achieve immortality, she is eventually defeated by Kamen Riders OOO, W, and Zero-One.

Goda
 is an artificial Greeed created from man-made arthropod-themed Core Medals called  who appears exclusively in the V-Cinema anniversary film Kamen Rider OOO 10th: Core Medal of Resurrection. The Kougami Foundation created the Goda Medals using data on Eiji Hino, resulting in Goda inheriting Hino's personality minus his redeeming qualities. Following the real Hino's demise and Ankh's resurrection, Goda possesses the former's body to kill the First OOO and take his power for himself. Despite succeeding in killing the First OOO and using the Core Medals' power to gain a physical form, Goda is killed by Ankh via Hino's body.

While using Hino's body, Goda uses the former's Rider powers until he absorbs the Core Medals' power, which he uses to turn himself into  and separate himself from Hino's body.

World of OOO
The  is an alternate universe that the "prime" version of Shintaro Goto accidentally enters while testing the Birth Driver X and appears exclusively in the web series OOO 10th Kamen Rider Birth: Secret Story of the Birth of Birth X. In this universe, Hina Izumi and Chiyoko Shiraishi become Kamen Riders OOO and Birth respectively instead of Eiji Hino, Akira Date, and Goto; Ankh is a scientist who fulfills Kiyoto Maki's role of developing Medal-based Rider systems while remaining an ally to the Riders; the primary Greeed are the Riders' allies instead of enemies, with Uva serving as Hina's partner; and Date is the CEO of the Date Foundation who becomes the Kyoryu Greeed instead of Maki.

Notes

References

External links
 Kamen Rider OOO official cast page at TV Asahi

OOO characters
Kamen Rider OOO
Kamen Rider OOO